"This Bitter Earth" is a 1960 song made famous by rhythm and blues singer Dinah Washington. Written and produced by Clyde Otis, it peaked to #1 on the U.S. R&B charts for the week of July 25, 1960, and also reached #24 on the U.S. pop charts.

Charts

Other recordings 

 In 1964, Aretha Franklin released a version on her album Unforgettable: A Tribute to Dinah Washington for Columbia Records.
 In May 1970, The Satisfactions released a version, reaching #36 on the U.S. R&B charts.
 Miki Howard recorded a version that appears on her 1992 album, Femme Fatale.
 In 2004, break-core musician Venetian Snares used vocals from this song in his own composition with the same title on his mini-album Moonglow/This Bitter Earth.
 Gladys Knight recorded the song for her 2006 album Before Me.
 Deborah Cox recorded the song for her 2007 album Destination Moon.
 On June 10, 2010, the song featured in So You Think You Can Dance, in a routine choreographed by Mia Michaels.
 The song was featured on the soundtrack for the 2010 Martin Scorsese film Shutter Island, in the form of a mashup with Max Richter's "On the Nature of Daylight." In 2012, the mashup was featured as the accompanying track to the launch trailer of The Secret World, an MMORPG from developer Funcom, published by Electronic Arts. It was also used in the Christopher Wheeldon's dance Five Movements, Three Repeats. The pas de deux set to the mashup was added to New York City Ballet's repertory later that year. The track featured on Richter's 2018 double-album The Blue Notebooks: 15 Years Edition.
 Erykah Badu and Nas released "This Bitter Land," which featured on the soundtrack of Steven Caple Jr.'s 2016 film The Land.
 In 2021 Veronica Swift released her adaptation of the Max Richter arrangement of the song.

Elsewhere in popular culture
The song is a key piece in the 1978 film Killer of Sheep by director Charles Burnett.

Notes and references 

1960 singles
Dinah Washington songs
Songs written by Clyde Otis
1960 songs
Mercury Records singles